Pasta salad (pasta fredda) is a salad dish prepared with one or more types of pasta, almost always chilled, and most often tossed in a vinegar, oil, or mayonnaise-based dressing.  It is typically served as an appetizer, side dish or a main course. Pasta salad is often regarded as a spring or summertime meal, but it can be served any time of year.

Origins
Whilst there is no clear origin for the salad, there are various theories that claim different origins for the salad.
Some historians and chefs such as Claudia Roden trace back the origin of pasta salad to Italian Jews in the Roman Empire, who reused cold pasta as Jewish Law prohibited cooking on sabbath. Others date it even further back to the Phoenecians.

The modern version of pasta salad that uses macaroni noodles dates back to 1914 in an American recipe.

Ingredients
The ingredients used vary widely by region, restaurant, seasonal availability, and/or preference of the preparer. The salad can be as simple as cold macaroni mixed with mayonnaise (a macaroni salad), or as elaborate as several pastas tossed together with a vinaigrette and a variety of fresh, preserved or cooked ingredients. Additional types of pasta may be used, such as ditalini. These can include vegetables, legumes, cheeses, nuts, herbs, spices, meats, poultry, or seafood.  Broccoli, carrot, baby corn, cucumber, olives, onion, beans, chick peas, peppers, and parmesan or feta cheeses are all popular ingredients in versions typically found at North American salad bars.

Oceanic commercial variation

In Australian and New Zealand cuisine, pasta salad became increasingly popular during the 1990s when commercial versions became more readily available in supermarket stores. It is made of cooked pasta pieces (usually either shell pasta, elbow-shaped pasta or penne) covered in mayonnaise and accompanied by carrots, capsicum (bell peppers), and sometimes celery. It is similar in style to the American macaroni salad.

Gallery

See also

 List of pasta dishes
 List of salads

References

External links

History
Pasta Salad Recipe

Australian cuisine
New Zealand cuisine
Noodle salads
Independence Day (United States) foods
Italian-American cuisine
American pasta dishes
American salads